The 1966 Cornell Big Red football team was an American football team that represented Cornell University during the 1966 NCAA University Division football season. Cornell finished fourth in the Ivy League.

In its first season under head coach Jack Musick, the team compiled a 6–3 record and outscored opponents 181 to 157. Fred Devlin was the team captain.

Cornell's 4–3 conference record placed fourth in the Ivy League standings. The Big Red outscored Ivy opponents 138 to 122.

Cornell played its home games at Schoellkopf Field in Ithaca, New York.

Schedule

References

Cornell
Cornell Big Red football seasons
Cornell Big Red football